The Cook Islands is represented at the 2006 Commonwealth Games in Melbourne by a 32-member strong contingent comprising 32 sportspersons and no officials.

Medals

Athletes
Athletes included Myra Moller, Sam Pera, Jr. and Sam Nunuku Pera.

The Rugby sevens side included Richard Piakura.

References

Cook Islands at the Commonwealth Games
Nations at the 2006 Commonwealth Games
2006 in Cook Islands sport